Coreopsis pulchra is a North American wildflower of the Southeastern United States, in the family Asteraceae.  Its common names are woodland tickseed, showy tickseed, and beautiful tickseed.

Coreopsis pulchra is native only to the Cumberland Plateau of northeastern Alabama (and perhaps historically in nearby Georgia) where it grows on sandstone outcrops. Because of its narrow habitat requirements and small geographic range, this species is considered imperiled.

Coreopsis pulchra blooms from June through September, and the flower heads are gold with dark centers. It is a perennial, herbaceous plant that grows to a height of about 60 cm (2 feet).

References

pulchra
Flora of the Southeastern United States
Plants described in 1903